Draco spilopterus, the Philippine flying dragon, is a species of agamid lizard. It is found in the Philippines and Indonesia.

References

Draco (genus)
Reptiles of the Philippines
Reptiles of Indonesia
Reptiles described in 1834
Taxa named by Arend Friedrich August Wiegmann